Marky Ramone and the Intruders were an American punk rock band formed by drummer Marky Ramone after the retirement of the Ramones.  The band is similar in sound to the Ramones but with a more powerful bass. The band released only two albums in its short existence. Todd Youth of Murphy's Law was the frontman for a short time.

Former members 
Marky Ramone – drums
Johnny Pisano – bass/vocals
Howie Accused – guitar
Alex Crank – guitar/vocals
Ben Trokan – guitar/vocals
Garrett Uhlenbrock, aka Skinny Bones – vocals
Todd Youth – vocals, guitar

Discography 
Marky Ramone and the Intruders (1996) – Thirsty Ear Recordings
The Answer to Your Problems? (Don't Blame Me! in South America) (1999) – Rounder Records

References 

American punk rock groups
Zoë Records artists
Thirsty Ear Recordings artists
Rounder Records artists